Night Waitress is a 1936 American drama film directed by Lew Landers and written by Marcus Goodrich. The film stars Margot Grahame, Gordon Jones, Vinton Hayworth, Marc Lawrence and Billy Gilbert. The film was released on December 18, 1936, by RKO Pictures.

Plot 
A waterfront waitress (Margot Grahame) and her boyfriend (Gordon Jones) know too much about a murder and gold.

Cast 
Margot Grahame as Helen Roberts
Gordon Jones as Martin Rhodes
Vinton Hayworth as George Skinner
Marc Lawrence as Dorn
Billy Gilbert as Torre 
Don 'Red' Barry as Mario Rigo
Otto Yamaoka as Fong 
Paul Stanton as District Attorney
Arthur Loft as Borgum
Walter Miller as Police Inspector
Anthony Quinn as gangster (uncredited)
Willie Best as Cars For Rent attendant (uncredited)

References

External links 
 

1936 films
American black-and-white films
RKO Pictures films
Films directed by Lew Landers
1936 drama films
American drama films
1930s English-language films
1930s American films